Loop is a 1999 Venezuelan drama film directed by Julio Sosa Pietri. The film was selected as the Venezuelan entry for the Best Foreign Language Film at the 71st Academy Awards, but was not accepted as a nominee.

Cast
 Jean Carlo Simancas as Alejandro del Rey
 Arcelia Ramírez as Lucía / Sandra
 Luly Bossa as Shara Goldberg
 Claudio Obregón as Julio Andrés Martínez
 Julio Medina as Ataúlfo
 Fausto Cabrera as Alfonso del Rey
 Roberto Colmenares as Francisco Leoz
 Amanda Gutiérrez as Mimí Cordero

See also
 List of submissions to the 71st Academy Awards for Best Foreign Language Film
 List of Venezuelan submissions for the Academy Award for Best Foreign Language Film

References

External links
 

1999 films
1999 drama films
Venezuelan drama films
1990s Spanish-language films